Zagnańsk  is a village in Kielce County, Świętokrzyskie Voivodeship, in south-central Poland. It is the seat of the gmina (administrative district) called Gmina Zagnańsk. The village has a population of 1,726.

The Bartek oak tree in the village is almost 686 years old.

References

Villages in Kielce County